Sir Alexander Penrose Cumming-Gordon, 1st Baronet (19 May 1749 – 10 February 1806) was a Scottish politician.

Cumming-Gordon sat as member of parliament (MP) for Inverness Burghs from 1802 to 1803. In 1804 he was created a baronet, of Altyre near Forres.

His second son Charles Cumming-Bruce was also a politician.

References

External links 
 

1749 births
1806 deaths
Baronets in the Baronetage of the United Kingdom
Members of the Parliament of the United Kingdom for Scottish constituencies
UK MPs 1802–1806